Wang Fanxi (March 16, 1907 – December 30, 2002) was a leading Chinese Trotskyist revolutionary.

Born near Hangzhou in Zhejiang province, he joined the Communist Party of China, then an illegal organisation, in 1925. In 1927, he went to Moscow to study at the Communist University of the Toilers of the East.  There he became a supporter of Trotsky and the International Left Opposition. On his return to China, Wang worked for the Communist Party and became a leading member of the Trotskyist October Group, and then the Chinese Left Opposition. He was jailed for most of the period from 1931 and 1937, and was expelled from the Communist Party for his views.

In 1941, the Chinese Left Opposition split and Wang and others formed the Communist League (Internationalist), which became the Internationalist Workers Party of China in 1949. That year, he was sent to Hong Kong to act as an international link for the group, but was soon exiled to Macau. He wrote extensively and remained an influential figure, aligned with the United Secretariat of the Fourth International. In 1975, he was forced to move again, and he emigrated to Leeds, England, where he died on December 30, 2002.

Footnotes

Works
Mao Zedong Thought
: Chinese Revolutionary, Memoirs 1919-1949
Studies on the Thought of Mao Tse-Tung
Problems of Chinese Trotskyism

Further reading

 Gregor Benton, China's Urban Revolutionaries: Explorations in the History of Chinese Trotskyism, 1921-1952. Atlantic Heights, NJ: Humanities Press, 1996.
 Gregor Benton (ed.), Prophets Unarmed: Chinese Trotskyists in Revolution, War, Jail, and the Return from Limbo. Leiden: Brill, 2015; Chicago: Haymarket Books, 2017.

1907 births
2002 deaths
Chinese Trotskyists
Writers from Jiaxing
Chinese expatriates in the Soviet Union
Moscow Sun Yat-sen University alumni
Republic of China essayists
National University of Peking alumni